The Albanians of Croatia are people of full or partial Albanian ancestry and heritage in Croatia.

They are an autochthonous national minority recognized by the Constitution of Croatia. As such, they elect a special representative to the Croatian Parliament, shared with members of four other national minorities. The Albanian language is recognised in Croatia. 

In the 2011 Croatian census, there were 17,513 Albanians living in Croatia, 0.41% of total population. The largest religious groups among the Albanians were Muslims (9,594 or 54.8% of them) and Catholics (7,109 or 40.6% of them).

In the 1712/14 census done in Lika and Krbava among Vlach population, and other documents, many surnames with Albanian and Arbanasi word roots were recorded, such as those with suffixes "-aj" (e.g. Bulaja, Mataija, Šolaja, Saraja, Suknajić, Rapajić), "-ez" (Kokez, Kekez, Ivez, Malez etc.), and others (Šimleša, Šimrak, Šinđo/a/n, Šintić, Kalember, Flego, Macura, Cecić, Kekić, Zotović etc.).

Albanians came to Croatia in various historical periods. In the Middle Ages they lived in coastal cities and some were assimilated with Vlachs, in the 17th and 18th century the Arbanasi people settled the area around Zadar, and in modern time they came as seasonal workers, war refugees or sportspeople. Many people in Croatia descended from earlier waves of Albanian migration bear surnames of linguistically Albanian origin, but do not speak the language and are not considered to be Albanians.

Demographics 

The 2011 census shows that at that time 17,513 Albanians lived in Croatia. This corresponds to 0.41% of the population. In 2001, the proportion of 15,082 persons had only 0.34%.

Of these, 9,594 (54.8%) are Muslims and 7,109 (40.6%) are Catholics. 17 belong to other Christian denominations and the remaining 793 (4.5%) are partly atheists, partly agnostics, give no indication with respect to religion or belong to other religions.

Albanians are concentrated in Istria (2,393), Dalmatia (1,025), Zadar (908) and in the north of the Croatian coast (2,410) as well as in the capital Zagreb (4,292). More live in smaller numbers scattered throughout Croatia.

History

Early history 

Some of them came to Croatian lands at the time of Venetian rule because in parts of Croatia and Albania were under the rule of the Venetian Republic. Thus through the internal migration, the Albanian families also migrated, of which a large number was croatianized over the centuries to come. Internal migration has been of economic nature.

Another period is the time of liberation wars against the Ottomans when Christian Albanian families migrated to the liberated territories of Croatia.

The Arbanasi (Albanian also Arbëreshët e Zarës "Albanians of Zadar") are a small population group in Croatia still existing today. They are Catholic Albanians who fled the Ottomans between 1726 and 1733 in the Croatian coastal country, where they are still present today. In the city of Zadar they founded their own named after them district, which persists to this day. The Arbanasi traditionally speak a different dialect of Albanian.

The original Albanian inhabitants of Catholic faith Peroj (Albanian Përrua) in Pula, who fled from the Ottomans in 1657, have given up their Albanian nationality.

Modern history 

At the time of Yugoslavia, Albanians migrated to Croatia for economic and political reasons, especially after 1945. Albanian migrants were mainly from Kosovo and North Macedonia.

Traditionally, Croatian Albanians have been involved with jewelry, filigree, bakery and restaurant management, such as bakeries and confectioners.
 
According to the Association of Volunteers of the Homeland War, 2,579 Albanian volunteers fought in the Croatian Army and various Croat paramilitary units during the Croatian War for Independence, with losses of 86 killed, 37 missing and more than 500 injured. Among the Albanians who fought during the war were the generals Rahim Ademi and Agim Çeku.

Politics
The only political party representing Albanians in Croatia is the Union of Albanians of Croatia (UAH), led by Ermina Lekaj Prljaskaj, she also serving as the representative of Albanian minority in Croatian parliament (Sabor), since 2011.

Notable Croats of Albanian origin

See also 

 Arbanasi
 Albanian diaspora
 Albania-Croatia relations

References